Liu Ching may refer to:

Liu Jing (disambiguation)
Liu Qing (disambiguation)